The 1944 All-Ireland Senior Hurling Championship Final was the 57th All-Ireland Final and the culmination of the 1944 All-Ireland Senior Hurling Championship, an inter-county hurling tournament for the top teams in Ireland. The match was held at Croke Park, Dublin, on 3 September 1944, between Cork and Dublin. The Leinster champions lost to their Munster opponents on a score line of 2–13 to 1–2.

This was Cork's fourth All-Ireland title in succession.

All-Ireland final

Overview
Sunday 3 September was the date of the 1944 All-Ireland senior hurling final between Dublin and Cork.  It was Cork's fourth consecutive appearance in the championship decider in-a-row, while Dublin last played in the All-Ireland final in 1942 when they were defeated by Cork.

On that occasion the fifteen members of the Cork team were one game away from uniqueness.  The All-Ireland final was a game that would set them apart from all other great hurling teams in the past and in the future as no other county had won four All-Ireland hurling titles in-a-row.  Cork achieved their first treble in 1894 while Tipperary and Kilkenny followed suit in 1900 and 1913 respectively.  On a damp September afternoon in 1944 Cork were out to break all records.

Match report
With the pre-match festivities completed the game began at 3:15pm.  Wartime travel restrictions meant that the attendance was just below 27,000, while a damp day resulted in a heavy sod under foot.  The opening ten minutes did not go Cork's way as many commentators had anticipated.  Dublin, with a host of household names on their team held the champions scoreless during the opening ten-minute tussle.  It was left the Jack Lynch, Cork's dual player, to open the scores with a point.  Seán Condon, the young team captain, stretched Cork's lead soon afterwards when he rifled over another three points for his team.  Christy Ring was the third Cork player to get his name on the score sheet when he sent over his first point of the day.  This point was soon followed by a Con Cottrell effort that also sailed over the bar to stretch Cork's lead even further.  Cork's final two points of the opening thirty minutes came from midfielder Jack Lynch, the man who opened Cork's scoring account.  Dublin's scoring efforts throughout the opening half only yielded two points, resulting in a 0–8 to 0–2 lead for ‘the Rebels’ at the interval.

After the restart Cork really took control of the game.  Joe Kelly, the Irish sprint champion, gave some dazzling displays with exceptional solo runs.  He opened Cork's scoring account after the interval with a quick goal that was shortly followed by a point.  Dublin staged a brief rally that resulted in a goal by Charlie Downes.  ‘The Dubs’ didn't give up, however, their many further attempts on the Cork goal were saved by Tom Mulcahy.  These saves gave Cork a lift and the Dublin comeback was aborted.  At the other end of the field Joe Kelly was still producing some dazzling solo runs while also capturing Cork's second goal of the game.  Johnny Quirke and Jim Morrisson tacked on a few more points for Cork, however, by this stage the game was far beyond Dublin's reach.  At the final whistle Cork were declared the winners by 2–13 to 1–2.

Joe Kelly and Tom Mulcahy were regarded by the public as the heroes of the team and were duly chaired off the field.  Seán Condon later became the fourth Cork player in as many years to collect the Liam MacCarthy Cup.  Nine players set a record by collecting their fourth consecutive All-Ireland medals; Jack Lynch, Willie Murphy, Batt Thornhill, Alan Lotty, Johnny Quirke, Christy Ring, Din Joe Buckley, Jim Young and Paddy O'Donovan.

Details

Match Rules
60 minutes.
Replay if scores level.

1
All-Ireland Senior Hurling Championship Finals
Cork county hurling team matches
Dublin GAA matches
All-Ireland Senior Hurling Championship Final
All-Ireland Senior Hurling Championship Final, 1944